Zhao (趙, ~910–~921) was a state early in the Five Dynasties period of the history of China in what is now central Hebei. The ancestors of Zhao's only prince, Wang Rong, had long governed the region as military governors (Jiedushi) of the Tang dynasty's Chengde Circuit (headquartered in modern Shijiazhuang, Hebei), and after the collapse of the Tang in 907, the succeeding Later Liang's founding emperor ("Taizu"), Zhu Wen made Wang, then his vassal, the Prince of Zhao. In 910, when the Emperor tried to directly take over the territory of Zhao and its neighboring Yiwu Circuit (headquartered in modern Baoding, Hebei), Wang Rong and Yiwu's military governor Wang Chuzhi turned against the Later Liang, aligning themselves with Later Liang's archenemy, Jin's prince, Li Cunxu, instead. In 921, Wang Rong's soldiers assassinated him, slaughtered the Wang clan, and supported his adoptive son Zhang Wenli (known as Wang Deming while under Wang Rong's adoption) to succeed him instead.  Li Cunxu soon defeated Zhang Wenli's son and successor Zhang Chujin and incorporated Zhao into Jin territory.

See also
Later Zhou

References 

 Old Book of Tang, vol. 142.
 New Book of Tang, vol. 211.
 History of the Five Dynasties, vol. 54.
 New History of the Five Dynasties, vol. 39.
 Zizhi Tongjian, vols. 266, 267, 268, 269, 271.

 
Former countries in Chinese history
10th-century establishments in China
910s establishments
920s disestablishments
10th-century disestablishments in China
States and territories established in the 910s
States and territories disestablished in the 920s